List of MPs elected in the 1727 British general election

This is a list of the 558 MPs or Members of Parliament elected to the 314 constituencies of the Parliament of Great Britain in 1727, the 7th Parliament of Great Britain and their replacements returned at subsequent by-elections, arranged by constituency.

Elections took place between 14 August 1727 and 17 October 1727.



By-elections 
List of Great Britain by-elections (1715–34)

See also
1727 British general election
List of parliaments of Great Britain
Unreformed House of Commons

References

 The House of Commons 1715–1754, ed. R Sedgwick  (1970)

External links
 History of Parliament: Members 1715–1754
 History of Parliament: Constituencies 1715–1754

1727
1727
1727 in Great Britain
Lists of Members of the Parliament of Great Britain